Escape from Mars (1999) is a made-for-TV film produced for the UPN Network. The story concerns five astronauts who make the first crewed trip to Mars in 2015.

The film was filmed in Winnipeg, Manitoba, Canada.

Cast
 Christine Elise as Lia Poirier, Sagan Cocommander
 Peter Outerbridge as John Rank, Sagan Cocommander
 Allison Hossack as Andrea Singer, Mission Chemist
 Michael Shanks as Bill Malone, Mission Architect
 Ron Lea as Jason, Mission Control Weasel
 Kavan Smith as Sergei Andropov, Mission Biogeochemist
 David Kaye as Steve Yaffe
 Peter Kelamis as David Adams, Mission Control Weasel 
 Julie Khaner as Gail "Mack" McConnell, Mission Control
 Tammy Isbell as Stephanie Rank, John's Ex-Wife
 Arlene MacPherson as Remi
 Aaron Pearl as Robert, Lia Poirier’s Fiancé 
 Jonathan Barrett as Richard Singer,  Andrea's Husband
 Darrell Nicholson as Andy Singer
 Sophia Sweatman as Amanda Singer

Home Release

Released on VHS.

Reception

Radio Times gave the movie two out of five stars. Moria gave the movie the same rating, finding the scientific realism of the movie a plus, but that the direction and characters were lacking. TV Guide gave the movie one of four stars, finding the movie spends too much time in the Earth bound control room.

See also
List of films set on Mars
List of television films produced for UPN

Notes

External links
 
 

American science fiction television films
Mars in film
American science fiction action films
1999 television films
1999 films
1990s science fiction action films
Films about astronauts
Films set in 2015
Films set in 2016
Films set in the future
Films directed by Neill Fearnley
Hard science fiction films
1990s English-language films
1990s American films
UPN original films